Netechma paralojana is a species of moth of the family Tortricidae. It is found in Ecuador (Morona-Santiago Province).

The ground colour of the forewings is cream pink, darkening terminally. The hindwings are whitish, mixed
with dirty ochreous in the apex part.

Etymology
The species name refers to the similarity to Netechma lojana, plus the prefix para (meaning close).

References

External links

Moths described in 2006
Endemic fauna of Ecuador
Fauna of Ecuador
paralojana
Moths of South America
Insects of South America